The 2014 Nippon Professional Baseball season is the 65th season since the NPB was reorganized in 1950.

Regular season standings

Climax Series

Note: All of the games that are played in the first two rounds of the Climax Series are held at the higher seed's home stadium. The team with the higher regular-season standing also advances if the round ends in a tie.

First stage
The regular season league champions, the Fukuoka SoftBank Hawks (PL) and the Yomiuri Giants (CL), received byes to the championship round.

Central League

Pacific League

* Postponed from October 13 due to Typhoon Vongfong

Final stage
The regular season league champions, the Fukuoka SoftBank Hawks (PL) and the Yomiuri Giants (CL), received a one-game advantage.

Central League

Pacific League

Japan Series

League leaders

Central League

Pacific League

See also
2014 Korea Professional Baseball season
2014 Major League Baseball season

References

 
2014 in baseball